Robert C. Hilliard is an American civil rights and personal injury attorney notable for his United States Supreme Court argument in Hernandez vs. Mesa seeking to hold a border patrol agent accountable for the cross border shooting of a Mexican national, Sergio Hernandez. He also was appointed and served as the nation's lead lawyer for personal injury victims in the General Motors ignition switch recalls litigation, one of the largest civil litigations in the country's history.

Early life 

Hilliard grew up in Newton, Texas, the youngest of three children. His father, Delmar Shelley Hilliard, was an Air Force A-1 Skyraider fighter pilot who flew 175 missions in Vietnam, and later became Newton's county attorney for 25 years. His mother, Bobbye Clifton Hilliard, was an artist, newspaper reporter, homemaker, and office manager for her husband's law office.

Robert C. Hilliard attended St. Edward's University in Austin, Texas, where he enrolled on a tennis scholarship, graduating summa cum laude with a bachelor's degree in English literature in 1980. While at St. Edwards, Hilliard was a four-year letterman in tennis and St. Edward's Athlete of the Year for 1979–1980. In 2016, he was given St. Edward's Distinguished Alumni Award. He went on to attend St. Mary's University School of Law, in San Antonio, Texas, graduating with honors in 1983.

Career 
In 1986, Hilliard founded the law firm of Hilliard Muñoz Gonzales, LLP, in Corpus Christi, Texas. Hilliard received his certification from the Texas Board of Legal Specialization in Personal Injury Trial Law in 1990 and Civil Trial Law in 1992.  

In 2012, Hilliard and Steve Shadowen co-founded Hilliard & Shadowen, LLP, in Austin, Texas, a law firm that engages in antitrust and civil rights litigation.

In 2017, the firm Hilliard Muñoz Gonzales, LLP became Hilliard Martinez Gonzales, LLP in when founding partner Jacobo Munoz retired, and John Martinez was made managing partner. In 2020, they opened an office in Chicago, IL.

Notable Cases

Hernández vs. Mesa 

Hilliard represented the family of Sergio Hernández, an unarmed 15-year-old Mexican citizen who was shot and killed by a U.S. Border Patrol agent in 2010. The court found in favor of Mesa.  Hernández was standing on Mexican soil when shot. The cases sparked a confrontation between former Mexican President Felipe Calderón and former U.S. Secretary of State Hillary Clinton.

Philanthropy 

In May 2017, the Hilliard's donated $1 million to Incarnate Word Academy in Corpus Christi, Texas for a new, 14,000-square-foot elementary level Montessori building.

Awards

Corpus Christi Bar Association 
2020 "Lawyer of the Year"

Elite Trial Lawyer of the Year - National Law Journal 

 2016: Awarded title in Products Liability category
 2015: Awarded title in Motor Vehicles category

Texas Super Lawyers - Thompson Reuters 

 18-Year Award, 2003, 2004, 2006-2021

The Litigation Counsel of America 
An invitation-only honorary society for trial lawyers. Membership is limited to less than one-half of one percent of U.S. lawyers.

 Hilliard is one of 3,500 Fellows

Innocence Project of Minnesota 

 2010: Honored with first-ever “Never Forgotten” award

St. Edward’s University 

 2016: Distinguished Alumni Award

References

External links 

American lawyers
Year of birth missing (living people)
Living people
St. Mary's University School of Law alumni
St. Edward's University alumni
People from Newton, Texas